Claude Ajit Moraes  (born 22 October 1965) is a British Labour Party politician and campaigner, who was a Member of the European Parliament (MEP) for London between 1999 and the United Kingdom's withdrawal from the EU on 31 January 2020. He was Chair of the Civil Liberties, Justice and Home Affairs Committee, Deputy Leader of the European Parliamentary Labour Party and Vice-President of the Socialists and Democrats Group in the European Parliament.

Background
Claude Moraes is of Indian descent. He was born in Aden (State of Aden), and grew up in Scotland, having moved to Dundee aged four from India. His parents are Indian Catholics from Karnataka (Mangalore) and Mumbai. He attended St Modan's High School, Stirling and studied Scots and English law and postgraduate international law at the University of Dundee, Birkbeck, University of London and the London School of Economics and Political Science. He is currently Associate Fellow at City, University of London's Institute for the Study of European Law (ISEL).

Previous work
After leaving Scotland, Moraes settled in East London, living and volunteering at Toynbee Hall, an anti-poverty charity, where he was later a Council Member.

He was House of Commons researcher to MPs John Reid and Paul Boateng following the 1987 General Election and a national officer at the Trades Union Congress in 1989, where he also  represented the TUC at the European Trade Union Confederation.

Prior to his MEP election, Moraes received recognition as director of the Joint Council for the Welfare of Immigrants, a UK-based independent legal protection NGO founded in 1967 specialising in refugee and migration issues. At JCWI he helped organise legal challenges in the UK and European Courts succeeding Dame Anne Owers as director in 1992. Moraes was appointed a Commissioner at the Commission for Racial Equality 1997-2002 and was an elected Council member of Liberty 1994–2002.

He has campaigned and written regularly on migration, refugee, human rights, digital human rights and counter terrorism/security policy.

He contested the parliamentary constituency of Harrow West in the 1992 General Election, placing second.

Member of the European Parliament, 1999–2020
He was elected to the European Parliament in the 1999 European elections, that year becoming the first South Asian (Indian) origin MEP elected to the European Parliament and London's first Black and Minority Ethnic (BAME) MEP. He was re-elected to the European Parliament at the number one position on the Labour Party list in the 2004 and again in the first-place position in the 2009, and 2014 European Elections.

Initially a member of the Employment and Social Affairs and Legal Affairs and Internal Market Committees he was involved in the campaign for and identifying barriers to the EU wide implementation of the Race Equality Directive (2000). His legislative reports include the Protection of Minorities in an Enlarged Europe (2005), Protection of Seasonal Workers in the EU (2014) and Blue Card Migration Directive (Revision) (2017).

From 2009 to 2014 he was the elected Spokesperson for the Socialists and Democrats Group (S&D) on the Civil Liberties, Justice and Home Affairs Committee.

In 2013 Moraes was appointed Rapporteur for the Parliament Inquiry into Mass Surveillance following the leaks from Edward Snowden. The Inquiry and his Report "US NSA surveillance programmes, surveillance bodies in various Member States and their impact on EU citizens' fundamental rights and on transatlantic cooperation in Justice and Home Affairs" , voted in March 2014, was sometimes referred to as the Parliament's "European Digital Bill of Rights" as it looked at human rights and commercial priorities for the EU in the areas of data protection, privacy, surveillance, governance of the internet, extreme content and take-down policy, encryption, and cybercrime.

He was Chair of the European Parliament Inquiry into Facebook in 2018 opening with a special evidence session questioning Mark Zuckerberg and the inquiry looked at wider issues of electoral interference, misuse of personal data, and the implications of Cambridge Analytica.

In July 2014 Moraes was elected Chairman of the European Parliament Committee on Civil Liberties, Justice and Home Affairs (LIBE Committee).

Following the 2016 United Kingdom European Union membership referendum, he became a member of the European Parliament's Brexit Steering Committee until the 2019 European Elections. He contributed to the Parliament's position on the Withdrawal Agreement in the areas of EU citizens rights, rights of British citizens in the EU, security union and law enforcement, data adequacy, migration, asylum law and free movement.

In 2018 as part of his Committee's increasing role in the humanitarian, budgetary and legislative aspects of the refugee crisis, he led delegations to Libya, Niger, Lebanon, and the Greek and Italian reception "hotspots" to improve the EU's response. In 2019 he continued his long standing refugee work as Rapporteur for the European Asylum Support Agency.

Also in 2018 he was Standing Rapporteur for the European Parliament consent procedure on the European Commission's decision to directly invoke Article 7 of the EU Treaties for the first time into alleged rule of law breaches by the Polish government. He led all-party European Parliament rule of law delegations that year to Poland and Slovakia following the murder there of investigative journalist Ján Kuciak.

In 2019 he oversaw, with the Committee on Budget Control, the European Parliament mandate to create and appoint the first European Chief Public Prosecutor and operational office tackling corruption, calling on EPPO's remit to be extended to fight serious organised criminals, including people traffickers.

In May 2019, Claude Moraes stood for the Labour Party at the number one position in the London constituency and was reelected in the 2019 European Elections. Following those elections he was elected Vice President of the Socialists and Democrats Group (S&D) in the European Parliament.

Honours and recognition

In 2011 Moraes was Dod's and the European Parliament Magazine's 'MEP of the Year' for work on human rights. In 2016 he was named as one of Politico Magazine's "40 MEPs Who Actually Matter". In 2017 the organisation Vote Watch Europe listed him as "the most influential" British MEP and sixth most influential MEP in the European Parliament. In 2019, with MPs Alberto Costa and Stuart McDonald he was given the Ambassador Award for work on EU citizens rights by the3million. Claude Moraes was appointed Officer of the Order of the British Empire (OBE) in the 2020 New Year Honours for services to human rights, and he was awarded an honorary doctorate (DUniv) by the University of Greenwich in 2022.

References

External links

1965 births
Living people
Alumni of the University of Dundee
Alumni of Birkbeck, University of London
Alumni of the London School of Economics
Labour Party (UK) MEPs
Commissioners for Racial Equality
Scottish people of Indian descent
British politicians of Indian descent
Scottish people of Portuguese descent
Aden emigrants to Scotland
MEPs for England 1999–2004
MEPs for England 2004–2009
MEPs for England 2009–2014
MEPs for England 2014–2019
Labour Party (UK) parliamentary candidates
MEPs for England 2019–2020
Officers of the Order of the British Empire